Karaikal Carnival is a cultural festival organised by the tourism department, during the Pongal Festival in Karaikal, one of the four parts of the Union Territory of Puducherry, to promote tourism in the district.

Events 
The events of the Carnival include competitive ingredients, lot of cultural and sporting events such as Marathon, Cycle Race, and Bullock cart Racing, for students and the public.
The carnival aims at identifying talents of youths of Karaikal and nurturing them. To achieve this goal, an exclusive light music programme was organised in which a number of youths from Karaikal participated

Entertainment elements  
The entertainment included cinematic attractions such as folk music by popular artists and Orchestras.

Airshow 
In 2007, the carnival had its first airshow.

Flotilla 
A flotilla will be constructed in Arasalar River at Beach Road where one can dine in amidst the water.

Carnival Song 
A song was composed by Mr. Natarajan, the son of 'Kalaikavalar' Karai Subbaiya and was played for audience at the valedictory function in 2007. The song can be downloaded. and was named "Carnival Song".

External links
 The Government's Website
 On Chennai Online
 Nagland Team Leaves for the fête

Reference 

Cultural festivals in India
Culture of Puducherry
Entertainment events in India
Karaikal}
Festivals in Karaikal